Mencke's monarch may refer to:

 Flores monarch, a species of bird endemic to Flores 
 Mussau monarch, a species of bird endemic to the Bismarck Archipelago

Birds by common name